Santiago Apóstol (Spanish: St James Apostle) is a Roman Catholic parish church located in Liétor, Community of Castilla-La Mancha, Spain.

The church is erected on the site an earlier church present before the 18th century, with a tower likely from the 15th century. The main facade is neoclassic in style with a tympanum displaying the cross of St James. The layout is a traditional Latin Cross with side chapels, and contains an 18th-century organ.

Among the chapel altars are those dedicated to: 
Santa Rita (1678) 
Resurrected (1794)
Rosary (1772) with polychrome wooden retablo completed in 1733 by Blas Crespo and an icon of the Virgin of the Rosary (1784) by Joseph López
Solitude with a retablo (1795) by Paolo Sistori and an image by Roque López
Immaculate Conception with a 17th-century retablo derived from the former convent of the Carmelite nuns
Our Lady of the Carmelites also with an retablo derived from the former convent of the Carmelite nuns
Virgin of Hope with image by Salcillo
Father Jesus with 18th-century retablo with an image of Christ by José Sánchez Lozano
St Joseph with retablo from 1773 carved by Matías Reolid with image (1862) by Eusebio Baglietto
St Cajetan
St Antony Abbott

Other works in the church include the main altar (1795) by Paolo Sistori and the Retablo de Nuestra Señora del Espino (1730) commissioned by Juan de Valdelvira Belmonte and his wife, Mariana de Tobarra Alcantud, with the image of the Virgin by José Sánchez Lozano. The parish museum contains various works, both Christian and ancient, from the region.

References 

Churches in Castilla–La Mancha
18th-century Roman Catholic church buildings in Spain
Neoclassical architecture in Castilla–La Mancha
Neoclassical church buildings in Spain